Allium rhabdotum is a species of flowering plant endemic to Bhutan.

References

Endemic flora of Bhutan
Flora of Bhutan
rhabdotum